Corrado or Corradino (female: Corrada or Corradina) is the Italian version of the name Conrad or Konrad.

It may refer to:

 Conrad of Piacenza (1290–1351), Italian penitent and hermit
 Corrado Alvaro (1895–1956), Italian journalist and writer
 Corrado Annicelli (1905–1984), Italian actor
 Corrado Aprili (born 1964), Italian tennis player
 Corrado Ardizzoni (1916–1980), Italian cyclist
 Corrado Augias (born 1935), Italian writer and television host
 Corrado Bafile (1903–2005), Roman Catholic cardinal
 Corrado Balducci (1923–2008), Roman Catholic theologian of the Vatican Curia
 Corrado Barazzutti (born 1953), Italian tennis player
 Corrado Benedetti (1957–2014), Italian footballer
 Corrado Böhm (1923–2017), Italian computer scientist
 Corrado Borroni (born 1973), Italian tennis player
 Corrado Cagli (1910–1976), Italian painter
 Corrado Capece (died 1482), Archbishop of Benevento
 Corrado Carnevale (born 1930), Italian judge
 Corrado Casalini (1914–?), Italian footballer
 Corrado Clini (born 1947), Italian politician
 Corrado Colombo (born 1979), Italian footballer
 Corrado Contin (1922–2001), Italian footballer
 Corrado Correggi, Italian businessman
 Corrado Maria Daclon (born 1963), Italian university professor, journalist and writer
 Corrado dal Fabbro (1945–2018), Italian bobsledder
 Corrado da Matelica (died 1446), Bishop of Bagnoregio
 Corrado d'Antiochia, Italian name for Conrad of Antioch (1240/41–1312), Sicilian nobleman
 Corrado del Monferrato, Italian name for Conrad of Montferrat (died 1192), Piedmontese nobleman
 Corrado de Concini (born 1949), Italian mathematician
 Corrado della Torre (1251–1307), Lombard condottiero
 Corrado Demetri della Suburra, name before election of Pope Anastasius IV (1073–1154)
 Corrado D'Errico (1902–1941), Italian screenwriter and film director
 Corrado Fabi (born 1961), Italian racing driver
 Corrado Fantini (born 1967), Italian shot putter
 Corrado Farina (1939–2016), Italian film director, screenwriter and novelist
 Corrado Fortuna (born 1978), Italian film actor and director
 Corrado Fumagalli (born 1967), Italian television presenter
 Corrado Gabriele (born 1966), Italian politician
 Corrado Gaipa (1925–1989), Italian actor
 Corrado Giannantoni (born 1950), Italian nuclear scientist
 Corrado Giaquinto (1703–1766), Italian Rococo painter
 Corrado Gini (1884–1965), Italian statistician
 Corrado Grabbi (born 1975), Italian footballer
 Corrado Guzzanti (1965), Italian actor, director, writer and satirist
 Corrado Hérin (1966–2019), Italian luger and cyclist
 Corrado Invernizzi, Italian actor, 
 Corrado Lorefice (born 1962), Archbishop of Palermo
 Corrado Lojacono (1924–2012), Italian singer-songwriter, record producer and actor
 Conrad Malaspina (The Old) and Conrad Malaspina (The Young), lords of Luinigiana
 Corrado Manili (died 1522), Bishop of Bagnoregio
 Corrado Mantoni (1924–1999), Italian radio and television host
 Corrado Mastantuono (born 1965), Italian comic book artist
 Corrado Mazzoni (1892–1917), Italian World War I lieutenant 
 Corrado Melfi (1850–1940), Italian archaeologist
 Corrado Merli (born 1959), Italian footballer
 Corrado Micalef (born 1961), Canadian ice hockey player
 Corrado Michelozzi (1883–1965), Italian painter
 Corrado Miraglia (1821–1881), Italian opera singer
 Corrado Nastasio (born 1946), Italian footballer
 Corrado Olmi (born 1926), Italian actor
 Corrado Orrico (born 1940), Italian football coach
 Corrado Paina (born 1954), Italian-Canadian poet
 Corrado Pani (1936–2005), Italian actor
 Corrado Parducci (1900–1981), Italian-American sculptor
 Corrado Passera (born 1954), Italian manager and banker and former Minister of Economic Development
 Corrado Pavolini (1898–1980), Italian futurist writer
 Corrado Pellanera (born 1938), Italian basketball player
 Corrado Pilat (born 1974), Italian rugby union player and coach
 Corrado Pizziolo (born 1949), Bishop of Vittorio Veneto
 Corrado Racca (1889–1950), Italian actor
 Corrado Rizza (born 1961), Italian DJ and producer
 Corrado Roi (born 1958), Italian comic book artist
 Corrado Sanguineti (born 1964), Bishop of Pavia
 Corrado Segre (1963–1924), Italian mathematician
 Corrado Tartarini (died 1602), Bishop of Forlì
 Corrado Tommasi-Crudeli (1834–1900), Italian physician
 Corrado II Trinci (died 1386) and Corrado III Trinci (died 1441), lords of Foligno
 Corrado Ursi (1908–2003), Archbishop of Naples
 Corrado Varesco (born 1938), Italian biathlete
 Corrado Veneziano (born 1958), Italian visual artist
 Corrado Verdelli (born 1963), Italian football player and coach
 Corrado Zambelli (1897–1974), Italian classical bass
 Corrado Zoli (1877–1951), Italian writer, diplomat and explorer

Fictional Characters 
 Corrado "Junior" Soprano, a character from the HBO crime drama The Sopranos

As Corradino
 Corradino D'Ascanio (1891–1981), Italian aeronautical engineer
 Corradino Mineo (born 1950), Italian journalist
 Corradino Heights in Malta, where were built the Corradino Lines and Corradino Batteries

See also
Conrad (disambiguation)
Konrad (disambiguation)
Corradi
Corradini

Italian masculine given names